Chisapani may refer to several places:

Chisapani, Bheri
Chisapani, Gandaki
Chisapani, Ramechhap
Chisapani, Mechi
Chisapani, Khotang